Begonia cucullata, also known as wax begonia and clubed begonia, is a species of the Begoniaceae that is native to South American countries of Argentina, Brazil, Paraguay, and Uruguay. A common garden plant and part of the section Begonia, it was described in 1805 by Carl Ludwig Willdenow (1765–1812). The specific epithet "cucullata" means "resembling a hood" or "hooded".

Description
The plant is an upright growing, herbaceous perennial that has almost symmetrical succulent pale green to pale reddish brown leaves that are ovate, glabrous 4–8 cm long and 6 cm wide, with edged, glossy and toothed crenation. Grown as a groundcover, the flowers of the plant are red, pink or white that bloom in the summer or year-round in warmer places, and the fruits have three wings.

Range
Native to South America, wax begonia is also found growing invasively in Florida, namely from the northern and central peninsula west to central panhandle, and also in Georgia. The plant may invade waysides, deforested areas, overgrazed pastureland, and wastelands.

Because they are such prolific seed producers, seeds are thought to be the primary way begonias spread when left unchecked. They can also root very easily, but this may not play much of a role under natural conditions.

Cultivation
Older varieties prefer shade, though newer varieties tolerate both full sun and shade. Indoors, they can thrive in a south- or east-facing window, provided they are acclimated when their environment is changed.

Varieties
The wax begonia marketed commercially as Begonia x semperflorens-cultorum is a hybrid of at least five species, including B. cucullata. The name wax begonia refers to the thick and waxy leaves of the group.

According to Catalog of Life (February 6, 2017) 6 and Kew Garden World Checklist, these varieties exist:

 Begonia cucullata var. cucullata
 Begonia cucullata var. hookeri (A.DC.) LBSm. & BGSchub. (1941)
 Begonia cucullata var. spatulata (G.Lodd. ex Haw.) Golding (1982)
 Begonia cucullata var. subcucullata (C.DC.)

According to Tropicos (February 6, 2017):

 Begonia cucullata var. arenosicola (C. DC.) LB Sm. & BG Schub.
 Begonia cucullata var. cucullata
 Begonia cucullata var. hookeri LB Sm. & BG Schub.
 Begonia cucullata var. sellowii A. DC.
 Begonia cucullata var. spatulata (Lodd.) Golding
 Begonia cucullata var. subcucullata (C. DC.) ined.

Gallery

References

cucullata
Flora of Argentina
Garden plants
Ornamental plants
Flora of Brazil
Flora of Uruguay
Flora of Paraguay
Plants described in 1805